Zachariah Josiahno Sumanti (born 24 September 1997) is an Indonesian badminton player.

Career 
In 2018, Sumanti lost in the quarter-finals of the 2018 Bangka Belitung Indonesia Masters partnering with Angelica Wiratama.

In 2019, Sumanti won the mixed doubles title at the Indonesia International partnering with Hediana Julimarbela. 

In 2021, Sumanti and Julimarbela lost in the semi-finals of the Orléans Masters. 

In 2022, Sumanti and Julimarbela won their second title in the Italian International. In August, they played in the World Championships but lost in the second round from 15th seeds Robin Tabeling and Selena Piek from the Netherlands. In September, they reached the Vietnam Open semifinals, but lost to fellow Indonesian pair Dejan Ferdinansyah and Gloria Emanuelle Widjaja. Played at the Denmark Open in October, he and his partner were defeated in the first round to top seeds Dechapol Puavaranukroh and Sapsiree Taerattanachai.

2023 
In January, Sumanti and Julimarbela started their season by losing in the first round of the Malaysia Open from the 2021 All England Open runner-up Yuki Kaneko and Misaki Matsutomo of Japan. In the following week, they lost again in the first round of the India Open from Danish pair Mathias Christiansen and Alexandra Bøje. They competed at the home tournament, Indonesia Masters, but had to lose in the first round from English pair Gregory Mairs and Jenny Moore. In the next tournament, they lost in the quarter-finals of the Thailand Masters from Korean pair Kim Won-ho and Jeong Na-eun.

Achievements

BWF International Challenge/Series (2 titles) 
Mixed doubles

  BWF International Challenge tournament
  BWF International Series tournament
  BWF Future Series tournament

Performance timeline

Individual competitions

Senior level

Men's doubles

Mixed doubles

References

External links 
 

1997 births
Living people
Minahasa people
People from Minahasa Regency
Sportspeople from North Sulawesi
Indonesian male badminton players
21st-century Indonesian people